The  is a Japanese railway line which connects Kurashiki in Okayama Prefecture with Utazu in Kagawa Prefecture. It is owned and operated jointly by West Japan Railway Company (JR West) and Shikoku Railway Company (JR Shikoku).

The line's name comes from the two islands it links: Honshu and Shikoku, and the old provincial names of the areas through which the line passes, Bitchū Province/Bizen Province and Sanuki Province.

History
The  Chayamachi - Kojima section opened on 20 March 1988, and the  Kojima - Utazu on 10 April 1988 in conjunction with the opening of the Seto-Ohashi Bridge system. 

This provided the first rail connection between Honshu and Shikoku, prior to this passengers traveled via the Uno Line and train ferry to Takamatsu.

The opening of the line also facilitated electrification of the Yosan Line between Takamatsu and Matsuyama, enabling direct services from both cities to Okayama.

Basic data
Operators, distances: 
West Japan Railway Company (JR West) (Services and tracks)
Chayamachi – Kojima: 
Shikoku Railway Company (JR Shikoku) (Services and tracks)
Kojima – Utazu: 
Japan Freight Railway Company (JR Freight) (Services)
Chayamachi – Kojima – Utazu: 
Gauge:  narrow gauge
Stations: 6
Double-tracked section: Entire line
Electrification: 1500 V DC
Railway signalling: Centralized Traffic Control (CTC)
Maximum speed:
Chayamachi – Kojima: 
Kojima – Utazu: 
CTC center:
Chayamachi – Kojima: Okayama Transport Control Center
Kojima – Utazu: Takamatsu Control Center

Station list

See also
List of railway lines in Japan

References

External links 

   
   

Rail transport in Okayama Prefecture
Rail transport in Kagawa Prefecture
Lines of West Japan Railway Company
Honshi-Bisan Line
Railway lines opened in 1988
1067 mm gauge railways in Japan